Headbolt Lane is a future railway station in the Towerhill/Northwood area of Kirkby in Merseyside, North West England. The opening of a station in the area has been an objective of the local authority since 1972 and detailed plans have been under development since at least 2013. Planning permission was granted in December 2021, with construction due to commence in January 2022. It is anticipated that the station will open in Spring 2023.

Once opened, it is anticipated that the station would replace  as the interchange between the Merseyrail Northern Line and unelectrified Kirkby-Wigan line, currently operated by Northern Trains.

History
Although the station was initially planned to act as a new Merseyrail terminus, the Electrification Task force declared the Kirkby to Salford Crescent via Wigan line to be a Tier 1 priority for electrification in 2015 which, if followed through, might enable the extension of Merseyrail services beyond Headbolt Lane. 

Plans were devised by Merseytravel and Lancashire County Council to extend Merseyrail to serve .
In 2017, the two authorities commissioned an initial £5 million feasibility study into establishing the new rail link and an intermediate station at Headbolt Lane. Initial estimates suggested that it would cost around £300 million and would take up to a decade to deliver.

In August 2019, Liverpool City Region Combined Authority announced that part of an agreed £172m funding package for the region would be used to fund the construction of the new station. The Combined Authority approved that the first £3.3 million of funding for the project in July 2020, before signing off a further £66 million in March 2021.

The station is designed to be built with three fully accessible platforms with accommodation for future Merseyrail extension to Skelmersdale. A 300 space car park and bus interchange is a part of the plan.

The Liverpool City Region Combined Authority announced in July 2021 that after a trial of a battery electric multiple unit (BEMU) version of the new Class 777, it will serve the new station on opening. This will not require the line extension to Headbolt Lane to be electrified.

The Department for Transport announced in July 2022 that it was rejecting the Strategic Outline Business Case for an extension to Skelmersdale. The DfT instead suggested that better bus links with the Kirkby–Wigan rail line would be a cheaper way of improving connectivity for Skelmersdale.

References

Proposed railway stations in Merseyside
Railway stations scheduled to open in 2023